Maïdine Douane (born 23 August 2002) is a French professional footballer who plays as an attacking midfielder for  club Metz.

Personal life 
Born in France, Douane is of Algerian descent.

References

External links 

 
 

2002 births
Living people
Sportspeople from Moselle (department)
People from Thionville
French footballers
French sportspeople of Algerian descent
Association football midfielders
Thionville FC players
FC Metz players
R.F.C. Seraing (1922) players
Championnat National 2 players
Belgian Pro League players
French expatriate footballers
Expatriate footballers in Belgium
French expatriate sportspeople in Belgium
Footballers from Grand Est